This article is a summary of the major literary events and publications of 1721.

Events
February – Joseph A. Hall's book, A Sober Reply to Mr. Higgs' Merry Arguments from the Light of Nature for the Tritheistic Doctrine of the Trinity..., published in the previous year, is burned by order of the British House of Lords for ridiculing Christian doctrine.
unknown dates
John Cleland becomes a pupil at Westminster School; at first an exemplary student, he would eventually be expelled for an unknown offence.
Lady Mary Wortley Montagu introduces to London the Ottoman Turkish method of inoculation against smallpox – variolation. The Princess of Wales is persuaded to test the treatment and it becomes fashionable.
Thomas Parnell's A Night-Piece on Death is published, inaugurating the "Graveyard poets" movement. Robert Blair's "The Grave", published in the same year, is sometimes given credit for being the first work in that genre.

New books

Prose
Joseph Addison – The Works of Joseph Addison
Penelope Aubin
The Strange Adventures of the Count de Vinevil and His Family
The Life of Madam de Beaumont
Nathan Bailey – An Universal Etymological English Dictionary
George Berkeley – An Essay Towards Preventing the Ruine of Great Britain
Richard Blackmore – A New Version of the Psalms of David
Shaftesbury – Letters from the Late Earl of Shaftesbury, to Robert Molesworth
Charles Gildon – The Laws of Poetry
Eliza Haywood – Letters from a Lady of Quality to a Chevalier (translation)
Montesquieu – Lettres persanes (Persian Letters)
Alexander Pennecuik – An Ancient Prophecy Concerning Stock-Jobbing, and the Conduct of the Directors of the South-Sea-Company
Matthew Prior – Colin's Mistakes
John Sheffield, Duke of Buckingham (died 1721) – The Works of the most noble John Sheffield, late Duke of Buckingham, published by His Grace in his life time
John Strype – Ecclesiastical Memorials
Emanuel Swedenborg – Prodromus principiorum rerum naturalium
Jonathan Swift
The Bubble
A Letter to a Young Gentleman, Lately Enter'd into Holy Orders
Thomas Tickell – Kensington Garden
Diego de Torres Villarroel – Pronósticos
Robert Wodrow – The History of the Sufferings of the Church of Scotland

Drama
Colley Cibber – The Refusal
Eliza Haywood – The Fair Captive
Aaron Hill – Fatal Extravagance
John Mottley – Antiochus
Thomas Odell – The Chimera
Edward Young – The Revenge

Poetry

Births
March 19 – Tobias Smollett, Scottish physician and novelist (died 1771)
August 21 – Lucretia Wilhelmina van Merken, Dutch poet and playwright (died 1789)
November 9 – Mark Akenside, English poet (died 1770)
November 16 – Johann Silberschlag, German theologian (died 1791)
December 25 – William Collins, English poet (died 1759)
December 27 – François Hemsterhuis, Dutch moral philosopher (died 1790)
unknown date – Robert Potter, English translator, poet and cleric (died 1804)

Deaths
January 3 – Juan Núñez de la Peña, Spanish historian (born 1641)
January 26 – Pierre Daniel Huet, French scholar and bishop (born 1630)
June 18 – Charlwood Lawton, English Jacobite author (born 1660)
August 13 – Jacques Lelong, French bibliographer (born 1665)
September 18 – Matthew Prior, English poet and diplomat (born 1664)
October 14 – Jean Palaprat, French dramatist (born 1650)

References

 
Years of the 18th century in literature